The women's team foil competition of the fencing event at the 2015 Southeast Asian Games is being held on 6 June 2015 at the OCBC Arena Hall 2 in Kallang, Singapore.

Schedule

Results

Final standing

References

Women's team foil
Women's sports competitions in Singapore
South